The Journal of Gay and Lesbian Social Services is a peer-reviewed academic journal that covers research related to sexual minorities and their social environment, including issues of homophobia and heterosexism and the personal, day-to-day experiences of people affected by these attitudes. The editor-in-chief is Melanie D. Otis.

External links 
 

Sexology journals
LGBT-related journals
Quarterly journals
Publications established in 1994
Taylor & Francis academic journals